Ateneo Cultural y Deportivo Don Bosco, usually just Don Bosco, is an Argentine rugby union club, based in the Florencio Varela district of Greater Buenos Aires. The team currently plays in Primera B, the third division of the Unión de Rugby de Buenos Aires league system.

History
The club was founded on March 21, 1967, by Norberto Chindemi in Almagro, Buenos Aires, with the purpose of bringing a place where youth could make activities they do not have at the school, such as rugby.

Don Bosco built its facilities in Florencio Varela, Buenos Aires although the club had received a land sited in La Matanza Partido in 1971, which finally was not used. In 2000 a branch (known as "Anexo Quilmes") was opened in Quilmes, Buenos Aires.

In October, 2011, Don Bosco promoted to Torneo de la URBA Grupo II, the second division of the URBA, after defeating San Fernando 26-15 in a Zona de Reubicación match.

References

External links
 

D
D